Toronto Life is a monthly magazine about entertainment, politics and life in Toronto, Ontario, Canada. Toronto Life also publishes a number of annual special interest guides about the city, including Real Estate, Stylebook, Eating & Drinking, City Home and Neighbourhoods.  Established in 1966, it has been owned by St. Joseph Communications since 2002. Toronto Life has a circulation of 87,929 and readership of 890,000. The magazine is a major winner of the Canadian National Magazine Awards, leading current publications with 110 gold awards including 3 awards for Magazine of the Year in 1985, 1989, and 2007. Toronto Life also won the Magazine Grand Prix award at the 2021 National Magazine Awards, with the jury writing that it is "alert to the cultural moment, bold in its journalistic exposés, up-to-the-minute in its services reportage and smart about the platforms it uses to deliver content to readers. The issues its editorial team assembled during the pandemic showed just how relevant and useful a first-class city magazine can be." It is also known for publishing an annual 50 most influential people in Toronto list.

History
Established in November 1966, Toronto Life was purchased by Michael de Pencier in 1972 and held until 2002, when it was sold to St. Joseph Media. The publisher also owns the tourism magazine Where Canada (published in several large cities), Fashion, Wish, Wedding Bells, and several smaller magazines. The current editor-in-chief is Malcolm Johnston, who succeeded long-time editor Sarah Fulford (since 2008) in February 2022.

In 2015, an article titled "Jennifer Pan’s Revenge: The inside story of a golden child, the killers she hired, and the parents she wanted dead" by Karen K. Ho brought the previously relatively obscure Jennifer Pan murder case to international attention.

In October 2018, it was announced that Toronto Life will launch a membership program with access to Toronto Life’s events, as well as special offers from local venues.

Controversies

Libel Suits

Successful 
In November 1987, Toronto Life published a 50,000-word article on the Reichmanns family written by Elaine Dewar. In January 1988, Paul, Albert and Ralph Reichmann sued Dewar and Toronto Life for $102 million, claiming that the article defamed their family. In 1991, after exhausting the cover of Toronto Life's libel insurance policy, an out-of-court settlement was reached between the parties that saw the article retracted and Toronto Life make “a substantial donation to four charities” designated by the Reichmanns. In its apology, Toronto Life said its article "incorporated many allegations and insinuations about the Reichmann family which ... there was no reasonable basis for" and said it now realized that "none of the allegations and insinuations should ever have been raised." Stephen Trumper, the president of Toronto Life Publishing Co., said “we should have been much more rigorous in that process and more precise in our conclusions,” and that “any and all negative insinuations and allegations in the article... are totally false.”

Unsuccessful 
In April 2015, Canadian entrepreneur Michael Elder, the son of Jim Elder, attempted to sue the magazine to prevent publication of a feature about him. Superior Court dismissed the motion for an injunction and awarded the magazine $17,000 in costs.

Unlawful Employment Practices 

In March 2014, Toronto Life was required to shut down its unpaid internship program implemented in 2009, after the Ontario Ministry of Labour declared that its longstanding practice of not paying interns was in contravention of the Employment Standards Act. The magazine responded, saying "The idea that we can start paying everybody completely misunderstands the nature of the economics of the magazine industry at the moment." Toronto Life'''s first (unpaid) intern, Derek Finkle, started with the magazine in 1993. During his internship he wrote a cover story for the magazine for free. He weighed in on the controversy saying that he backs the decision of the Ontario Ministry of Labour.

 Journalism Ethics Violations 
In December 2014, Toronto Star'' published an investigation stating that in 2013, the magazine dismissed a feature about 15 women Jian Ghomeshi was dating after the protest of his PR team.

In January 2018, the magazine was accused of hiding a published negative review of steakhouse BlueBlood from its website.

References

External links
 Toronto Life

Local interest magazines published in Canada
Monthly magazines published in Canada
St. Joseph Media magazines
Magazines published in Toronto
Magazines established in 1966
1966 establishments in Ontario